De nugis curialium (Medieval Latin for "Of the trifles of courtiers" or loosely "Trinkets for the Court") is the major surviving work of the 12th-century Latin author Walter Map. He was an English courtier of Welsh descent. Map claimed that he was a man of the Welsh Marches (marchio sum Walensibus);. He was probably born in Herefordshire, but his studies and employment took him to Canterbury, Paris, Rome and to several royal and noble courts of Western Europe. The book takes the form of a series of anecdotes of people and places, offering many sidelights on the history of his own time. Some are from personal knowledge, and apparently reliable; others represent popular rumours about history and current events, and are often far from the truth.

Outline of contents

Distinctio prima
 A comparison of royal courts with Hell; Hell and its mythical inhabitants
 Courtiers and serfs (including a conversation with Ranulf de Glanvill)
 The legendary King Herla and the origins of the Wild Hunt
 Tale of an early king of Portugal (probably Afonso I or Sancho I) who had his wife murdered
 Anecdotes of the poet Giscard de Beaulieu and of another Cluniac monk
 The capture of Jerusalem by Saladin on 2 October 1187
 Founding of the Carthusian Order
 Founding of the Order of Grandmont by Saint Stephen of Muret
 Founding of the Knights Templar by Hugues de Payens with anecdotes of their early years
 The senex Axasessis or Old Man of the Mountain, founder of the Assassins
 Founding of the Knights Hospitaller
 Foundation of the Cistercian Order with anecdotes of Stephen Harding, Bernard of Clairvaux and Arnold of Brescia
 Further anecdotes of the Cistercians, Benedictines, Grandmontines and Carthusians
 Gilbert of Sempringham and his Order
 The heretic or robber bands known as Routiers, Brabantians or Brabazons
 The heretics called Publicans and Patarines; this section includes a tale of devil-worship which illustrates the development of medieval ideas of witchcraft 
 Narrative of a meeting with the Waldensians, who had come to the Third Lateran Council at Rome in 1179 to petition Pope Alexander III for the right to preach
 Story told by Philip of Naples of a meeting in Montenegro with three hermits, a Frenchman, an Englishman and a Scot

Distinctio secunda
 Prologue
 Anecdote of Gregory, a monk of Gloucester
 Anecdotes of Peter of Tarentaise
 Anecdote about a hermit, a demonic pet snake, and foolish charity
 A meeting with Luke of Hungary (afterwards archbishop of Esztergom) at Gerard la Pucelle's lectures at the University of Paris; Luke's later encounters with the warring royal family of Hungary, Géza II, his sons István III and Béla III and brothers László II and István IV, as told to Walter Map by Hugh of le Mans, bishop of Acre
 Welsh religious practices, as exemplified by a retainer in the household of William de Braose, Lord of Bramber
 Helya, a Welsh hermit in the Forest of Dean
 Tale about Cadoc, Welsh king and saint
 Tale of the Welshman Gwestin Gwestiniog and his fairy bride; the tale of their son Triunein Vagelauc, his service at the court of the king of Deheubarth, and an attack on King Brychan of Brycheiniog (i.e., Brecknock)
 Tales of Wild Edric, his fairy bride, and their son Alnoth; with a brief discussion of incubi and succubi
 Brief meditation on fantastic narratives and their theological implications; tale of a knight of "Lesser Britain" (i.e., Brittany) who rescued his dead wife from the fairies
 Tale of demonic infanticide
 Tale of Saint Anthony, who encountered both a centaur and (apparently) Pan while searching for Saint Paul
 Anecdote about an unknown knight at a tournament in Louvain
 The legendary fighter Gado and a supposed Roman invasion of Offa's kingdom
 Tales of Andronikos I Komnenos
 Gillescop the Scot
 The Welsh and their hospitality
 Tales of King Llywelyn and his wife; with a reminiscence of a discussion of the Welsh between Walter Map and Thomas Becket
 Tales from South Wales: Conan the Fearless, Cheveslin the Thief, and a story from Hay-on-Wye
 Revenants, citing Gilbert Foliot and Roger, bishop of Worcester
 Revenant from the Historia Caroli Magni (pseudo-Turpin)
 A ghost story from Northumberland
 The benefits of not following proverbial advice
 Brief conclusion in which Walter calls himself a "huntsman" (venator) who brings home game for the reader

Distinctio tertia
 Prologue; a brief justification of fiction and its pleasures
 The friendship of Sadius and Galo
 The quarrels of Parius and Lausus
 The story of Raso the vavasour and his wife
 The story of Rollo and his wife

Distinctio quarta
 Autobiographical prologue and "epilogue"
 Copy of the letter (sometimes found among the works of Saint Jerome) in which Valerius advises Rufinus against marriage
 Story of the boy Eudo deceived by the Devil
 Story of a Cluniac monk (already told in Distinctio prima)
 Story of a knight of "Lesser Britain" (i.e., Brittany) who rescued his dead wife from the fairies (already told in Distinctio secunda)
 Story of Henno-with-the-Teeth (probably the Norman nobleman Hamon Dentatus) and his Melusine-like wife 
 Story of Wild Edric and his fairy bride; with a description of their interview with King William I (already told in Distinctio secunda but here the tale includes details not found in the earlier account)
 Story of Gerbert of Aurillac (Pope Sylvester II) deceived by the Devil
 Story of the cobbler of Constantinople
 Story of the merman Nicholas Pipe; anecdotes about phantom herds of animals; story of King Herla (already told in Distinctio prima); a brief satire on the court of King Henry II
 Story of Salius
 Story of Alan, so-called King of Brittany (apparently Alan Fergant)
 Story of the merchants Sceva and Ollo

Distinctio quinta
 Prologue; reflections on fame and the chansons de geste
 Story of the unidentified Apollonides, rex in partibus occidentis ("a king of the western regions")
 Life and character of Godwin, Earl of Wessex
 Life of Canute the Great and his dealings with Godwin
 Henry I of England and Louis VI of France
 The death of William II of England, regum pessimus ("the worst of kings"); Map's first-hand account of the character of King Henry II; and Map's description of his own running dispute with Henry's illegitimate son Geoffrey
 A satirical comparison of the court of King Henry II with Hell (essentially a rough draft of the opening of Distinctio prima). This concluding chapter begins with a citation of the words of Saint Augustine: "I am in the world and I speak of the world, but I do not know what the world is".

Notes

References
 Antonia Gransden, Historical Writing in England, c. 550 to c. 1307 (London: Routledge, 1974) pp. 242–244.
 Leo Ruickbie, Witchcraft Out of the Shadows: A Complete History. Robert Hale, 2004.
 Levine, Robert. "How to Read Walter Map." Mittellateinisches Jahrbuch 23 (1988): 91-105. Made available online by prof. Levine.

Editions and translations 
 Gualteri Mapes De nugis curialium distinctiones quinque ed. Thomas Wright. London: Camden Society, 1850 (Latin text). Available here (Internet Archive) and Google Books scans here and here.
 Walter Map, De nugis curialium ed. M. R. James. Oxford, 1914. Anecdota Oxoniensia, Medieval and Modern Series, 6 (Latin text). PDF available online.
 Walter Map's De nugis curialium tr. M. R. James. 1923. Cymmrodorion Record Series no. 9 (translation).
 Walter Map. De nugis curialium. Ed. and tr. M. R. James, C. N. L. Brooke, and R. A. B. Mynors. Oxford: Clarendon Press, 1983. (Latin text and facing-page English translation).

12th-century Latin books
British literature
Occult books
Works by Walter Map